Jan Kodeš defeated Alex Metreveli in the final, 6–1, 9–8(7–5), 6–3 to win the gentlemen's singles tennis title at the 1973 Wimbledon Championships. The final included a tie-break played at 8–8 in the second set; it was the first ever Wimbledon singles final to include a tie-break.

81 of the top Association of Tennis Professionals (ATP) players, including defending champion Stan Smith, boycotted Wimbledon in 1973 in protest against the suspension of Nikola Pilić by the Yugoslav Tennis Association, supported by the International Lawn Tennis Federation (ILTF). This resulted in numerous qualifiers and lucky losers.

Seeds

  Ilie Năstase (fourth round)
  Jan Kodeš (champion)
  Roger Taylor (semifinals)
  Alex Metreveli (final)
  Jimmy Connors (quarterfinals)
  Björn Borg (quarterfinals)
  Owen Davidson (fourth round)
  Jürgen Fassbender (quarterfinals)

The original seeding list before the boycott was:

  Stan Smith
  Ilie Năstase
  John Newcombe
  Arthur Ashe
  Ken Rosewall
  Tom Okker
  Marty Riessen
  Roy Emerson
  Tom Gorman
  Cliff Richey
  Adriano Panatta
  Manuel Orantes
  Alex Metreveli
  Bob Lutz
  Jan Kodeš
  Roger Taylor

Qualifying

Draw

Finals

Top half

Section 1

Section 2

Section 3

Section 4

Bottom half

Section 5

Section 6

Section 7

Section 8

References

External links

 1973 Wimbledon Championships – Men's draws and results at the International Tennis Federation

Men's Singles
Wimbledon Championship by year – Men's singles